Sandford is a residential locality in the local government area (LGA) of Clarence in the Hobart LGA region of Tasmania. The 2016 census recorded a population of 1883 for the state suburb of Sandford.

It is a town located on the South Arm Peninsula on the outskirts of Hobart.
Sandford is also home to the Sandford Rifle Club which is located in Rifle Range Road. It is far enough from the Tasmanian capital of Hobart to consist largely of bushland, but near enough to be within commuting distance.
Most of the inhabitants of Sandford live on a large acreage, either used for farming or recreational purposes.

History
Sandford was gazetted as a locality in 1966.
Muddy Plains Post Office opened on 20 November 1850. It was renamed "Sandford" in 1887 and closed in 1972.

Geography
The waters of Ralphs Bay form the western boundary, and Frederick Henry Bay most of the southern and eastern.

Road infrastructure
Route B33 (South Arm Road) runs through from north to south.

References

South Arm Peninsula
Localities of City of Clarence